On 24 January 2008 Prime Minister of Italy Romano Prodi lost a vote of confidence in the Senate, which caused the collapse of his government. Prodi's resignation led President Giorgio Napolitano to ask the president of the Senate, Franco Marini, to attempt to form a caretaker government. After Marini acknowledged an interim government could not be formed due to the lack of a clear majority in Parliament willing to support it, an early general election was scheduled for 13 April and 14 April 2008.

Background
Prodi had at the time been in office for 20 months, after his centre-left coalition had won a majority of seats in Parliament in the April 2006 general election. One of the parties making up the coalition was Union of Democrats for Europe (UDEUR), led by Clemente Mastella, who Prodi had chosen as his Minister of Justice.

In 16 January 2008, following media reports about an extensive corruption investigation involving him and his wife – an UDEUR politician in Campania – Mastella resigned from the position of Minister.

After first promising to keep backing the government, he later withdrew his support, in part due to pressure from the Vatican, which objected to the government's liberal reform, especially its plan of introducing registered partnerships for same-sex couples.

Mastella's decision arrived a few days after the Constitutional Court allowed a referendum, which would have modified the electoral system and, among other things, made it harder for smaller parties like Mastella's to win seats, to take place. As the collapse of the government would have disrupted the referendum, this further cemented Mastella's opinion that triggering a political crisis was necessary.

The crisis 
UDEUR's defection forced the question of whether Prodi still had enough support in Parliament to govern. On 22 January, Prodi asked for a confidence vote in the Chamber of Deputies, which he ended up winning the following day, with UDEUR MPs not voting.

On 24 January, Prodi asked for a confidence vote in the Senate. The ensuing debate, held between 3pm and 9pm (CET), was heated and dramatic. When UDEUR party Senator Stefano Cusumano decided he would rebel against the party and back the government, he was verbally harassed by some of his colleagues, who called him an "hysterical faggot" and "traitor", with one of them reportedly going as far as to spit in his face. At this point Cusumano apparently fainted, and was carried out on a stretcher. Despite Cusumano's defection, the government lost the vote. After the President of the Senate announced the results, members of the opposition, including National Alliance MP Nino Strano started celebrating, opening a champagne bottle and eating Mortadella ("Mortadella" was a derogatory nickname employed against Romano Prodi).

Aftermath

On 30 January 2008, Napolitano asked Franco Marini to attempt to form a caretaker government, with the goal of avoiding a snap election until a new electoral system could have been in place The electoral system which was in place at the time had drawn criticism both from the outgoing government and from the opposition, as well as from the general population. A common source of criticism was the fact voters could not pick individual candidates, and were instead forced to choose between slates prepared by parties. Some also felt that the presence of a majority bonus, to be awarded nationally for the Chamber of Deputies, and in each region for the Senate of the Republic, distorted the results of the election and created the risk of a Chamber of Deputies and a Senate at odds with each other in the event of a close election.  

After Marini was given the task to try to form a new government, two politicians (Bruno Tabacci and Mario Baccini) splintered from the Union of Christian and Centre Democrats (UDC) to form the White Rose, while two leading members of the Forza Italia faction Liberal Popular Union (Ferdinando Adornato and Angelo Sanza) switched parties and joined the UDC. On 4 February, the Liberal Populars (an UDC faction which favours merging with Forza Italia) seceded from UDC, and merged with Berlusconi's People of Freedom later the same year.

On 4 February 2008 Marini acknowledged that he had not found a majority willing to back a government led by him and resigned his mandate,  mainly due to opposition from the center-right parties Forza Italia and National Alliance, which, according to polls, were likely to win if a snap election was held, and as such wanted one to be called 

On 11 February 2008, President Napolitano dissolved Parliament and called for fresh elections. Elections were held on 13 April and 14 April 2008, together with the administrative elections. The elections resulted in a decisive victory for Berlusconi's centre-right coalition.

See also

 2019 Italian government crisis
 2021 Italian government crisis
 2022 Italian government crisis

Notes

References

Political crisis
January 2008 events in Europe
Government crises
2008 government crisis